Beck – Vita nätter (English: Beck – White Nights) is a 1998 Swedish police film about Martin Beck, directed by Kjell Sundvall.

Cast 
 Peter Haber as Martin Beck
 Mikael Persbrandt as Gunvald Larsson
 Stina Rautelin as Lena Klingström
 Per Morberg as Joakim Wersén
 Ingvar Hirdwall as Martin Beck's neighbour
 Rebecka Hemse as Inger (Martin Beck's daughter)
 Fredrik Ultvedt as Jens Loftsgård
 Michael Nyqvist as John Banck
 Anna Ulrica Ericsson as Yvonne Jäder
 Peter Hüttner as Oljelund
 Bo Höglund as Mats (the waiter)
 Emil Forselius as Mikael Sjögren (Martin Beck's son)
Dubrilla Ekerlund as Nina (Mikael's girlfriend)
 Katarina Ewerlöf as Jeanette Bolin
 Lennart Hjulström as Lennart Gavling
 Torsten Wahlund as Bengt "Ugglan" Hakdahl
 Lennart R. Svensson as the fieldworker
 Douglas Johansson as the man from LIC
 Jonas Uddenmyr as Anders Johansson
 Tytte Johnsson as Agneta (Mikael's mother)

References

External links 

1998 television films
1998 films
Films directed by Kjell Sundvall
Martin Beck films
1990s Swedish-language films
1998 crime films
1990s police procedural films
1990s Swedish films